The 2016 Red Bull Air Race of Chiba was the third round of the 2016 Red Bull Air Race World Championship season, the eleventh season of the Red Bull Air Race World Championship. The event was held in Chiba, Japan.

Master Class

Qualification

Due to the high seas and rough conditions on the racetrack on Saturday, the Race Committee was forced to cancel the Qualifying session of the Master Class. The Round of 14 fixtures were decided by championship position, whilst the Challenger Class race would take place on Sunday.

Round of 14

 Pilot received 1 second in penalties
 Pilot received 2 seconds in penalties
 Pilot received 3 seconds in penalties

Round of 8

 Pilot received 1 second in penalties

Final 4

Challenger Class

Results

Standings after the event

Master Class standings

Challenger Class standings

 Note: Only the top five positions are included for both sets of standings.

References

External links

|- style="text-align:center"
|width="35%"|Previous race:2016 Red Bull Air Race of Spielberg
|width="30%"|Red Bull Air Race2016 season
|width="35%"|Next race:2016 Red Bull Air Race of Budapest
|- style="text-align:center"
|width="35%"|Previous race:2015 Red Bull Air Race of Chiba
|width="30%"|Red Bull Air Race of Chiba
|width="35%"|Next race:2017 Red Bull Air Race of Chiba
|- style="text-align:center"

Chiba
Red Bull Air Race World Championship
Red Bull Air Race World Championship